Arantxa Sánchez Vicario was the defending champion but lost in the third round to Amanda Coetzer.

Martina Hingis won in the final 3–6, 6–3, 7–6 against Monica Seles.

Seeds
A champion seed is indicated in bold text while text in italics indicates the round in which that seed was eliminated. The top nine seeds received a bye to the second round.

  Martina Hingis (champion)
  Arantxa Sánchez Vicario (third round)
  Jana Novotná (third round)
  Monica Seles (final)
  Conchita Martínez (semifinals)
  Lindsay Davenport (quarterfinals)
  Anke Huber (quarterfinals)
  Irina Spîrlea (third round)
  Iva Majoli (third round)
  Karina Habšudová (first round)
  Mary Joe Fernández (first round)
  Barbara Paulus (third round)
  Amanda Coetzer (quarterfinals)
  Brenda Schultz-McCarthy (semifinals)
  Elena Likhovtseva (first round)
  Magdalena Maleeva (second round)

Draw

Finals

Top half

Section 1

Section 2

Bottom half

Section 3

Section 4

References
 1997 Family Circle Cup draw (Archived 2009-09-25)

Charleston Open
1997 WTA Tour